The 2022–23 PGA Tour is the 108th season of the PGA Tour, and the 56th since separating from the PGA of America. The season began on September 15, 2022. The 2023 FedEx Cup Playoffs will begin on August 10, and conclude on August 27, 2023.

It is intended that the 2022–23 season will be the final season with the current wraparound format (that started in 2013–14). The tour plans to return to a traditional calendar-year format starting in 2024.

Changes for 2022–23

Prize funds
The Tour announced record prize money for the 2022–23 season, with increased purses for elevated events including:
Sentry Tournament of Champions (from US$8.2 million to $15 million)
Genesis Invitational (from $12 million to $20 million)
Arnold Palmer Invitational (from $12 million to $20 million)
The Players Championship (from $20 million to $25 million)
WGC-Dell Technologies Match Play (from $12 million to $20 million)
Memorial Tournament (from $12 million to $20 million)
FedEx Cup playoff events (from $15 million to $20 million)

On October 19, 2022, the Tour announced four additional events with elevated purses:
WM Phoenix Open (from $8.5 million to $20 million)
RBC Heritage (from $8.3 million to $20 million)
Wells Fargo Championship (from $9.3 million to $20 million)
Travelers Championship (from $8.6 million to $20 million)

Eligibility changes
The number of players competing in the FedEx Cup playoffs will be reduced from 125 to 70. The top 70 will compete at the FedEx St. Jude Championship, the top 50 at the BMW Championship, and the top 30 at the Tour Championship.

Prior to the start of the season, it was reported that a letter had been sent to PGA Tour members who had joined LIV Golf but not resigned their membership of the PGA Tour advising them that their membership would "not be renewed for the 2022–23 season".

Schedule
The following table lists official events during the 2022–23 season.

Unofficial events
The following events were sanctioned by the PGA Tour, but did not carry FedEx Cup points or official money, nor were wins official.

Location of tournaments

FedEx Cup

Points distribution

The distribution of points for 2022–23 PGA Tour events is as follows:

Tour Championship starting score (to par), based on position in the FedEx Cup rankings after the BMW Championship:

FedEx Cup standings
Top five in the FedEx Cup standings as of March 12, 2023 (The Players Championship):

See also
2022 in golf

2022 European Tour
2023 European Tour
2023 Korn Ferry Tour

Notes

References

External links 
Official site

2023
2022 in golf
2023 in golf
Current golf seasons